The 1971 Women's Open Squash Championships was held at the BP Club in Sydenham, London from 19–25 February 1971.Heather McKay (née Blundell) won her tenth consecutive title defeating Jenny Irving in the final. This equalled the previous record of ten wins set by Janet Morgan from 1950 through to 1959.

Seeds

Draw and results

First round

Second round

Third round

Quarter-finals

Semi-finals

Final

References

Women's British Open Squash Championships
Sydenham, London
British Open Squash Championship
Women's British Open Squash Championship
Squash competitions in London
Women's British Open Championship
British Open Championship
Women's British Open Squash Championship